Rednal rail crash was a rail accident that occurred near Rednal station in Shropshire.

At 12:29 an excursion train from Birkenhead left Chester for Shrewsbury consisting of 28 coaches and two brake vans and hauled by two locomotives. An additional four coaches were added at Gobowen. 

When the train reached Whittington it began to gain speed on the gradient, but the driver of the front locomotive did not see the flag warning of the work ahead. The brakes were applied when the workmen were sighted, but it was too late to stop such a heavy train. The lead locomotive derailed on the unsupported track, but continued along the ballast until it reached points outside Rednal station where it ran off the rails and turned over.  The extreme weight of the following train meant that the first four carriages were destroyed completely, killing 11 passengers and 2 train crew. 

The enquiry, while criticizing the lack of braking power on such a massive train, blamed mainly the inadequate protection of the permanent way work, which should be supplemented by detonators.

Sources

External links
Accident Returns: Extract for Accident at Rednal on 7 June 1865
Engraved plate taken from The Illustrated London News

Railway accidents and incidents in Shropshire
Railway accidents in 1865
1865 in England
Rail transport in Shropshire
History of Shropshire
19th century in Shropshire
Derailments in England
June 1865 events
1865 disasters in the United Kingdom